The word rectifier refers to the general act of straightening. It may refer to:
 Rectifier, a device for converting alternating current to direct current
 Rectifier (neural networks), an activation function for artificial neural networks
Rectifier, a guitar amplifier manufactured by Mesa Boogie.

See also

 Rectification (disambiguation)
 Rectified spirit